Lingasamudram is a village in Nellore district of the Indian state of Andhra Pradesh. It is located in Lingasamudram mandal in Kandukur revenue division.

Politics
Lingasamudram is under Kandukur assembly constituency and Nellore parliament constituency.

References 

Villages in Prakasam district